The UAE Football League (UFL) Top Scorer is awarded by the Sheikh Majid Bin Mohammed Football Season Award, to the top scoring Emarati player of the season.

Wins By Club

References

United Arab